William Dick Duff MC (19 September 1890 – 7 October 1953) was a South African soldier and cricketer.

Military career
Born in Pietermaritzburg, William Duff enlisted as a private in the 1st Mounted Rifles (Natal Carbineers) in August 1914 and was commissioned a lieutenant in the 6th South African Infantry in December 1915. He embarked for East Africa in January 1916, and was severely wounded on 21 March. After recovering and returning to duty in November 1916, he served as aide-de-camp to the General Officer Commanding the 2nd East African Infantry Brigade. Suffering from malaria and anaemia, he was released from service on 2 January 1918. He was awarded the Military Cross.

Cricket career
A leg-break and googly bowler, Duff made his first-class debut in 1919. Playing in his first Currie Cup match a year later, he took 4 for 37 and 3 for 55 in Transvaal's innings victory over Griqualand West.

He played irregularly for Transvaal over the next four seasons. In 1924-25 when S. B. Joel's English team toured, he took three wickets against them for Transvaal in a first-class match followed immediately by seven wickets for East Rand in a two-day match. He was selected for South Africa in the second and third of the five unofficial Tests, but took only three wickets. He played no further first-class cricket.

References

External links

1890 births
1953 deaths
South African military personnel of World War I
Recipients of the Military Cross
Cricketers from Pietermaritzburg
South African cricketers
Gauteng cricketers